William McCauley may refer to:
 William McCauley (American football), American football player and coach
 William F. McCauley, United States Navy admiral
 William J. McCauley, American attorney and politician
 Bill McCauley, Major League Baseball player

See also
 William Macaulay (disambiguation)
 William McAuley (born 1975), better known by his stage name Bleu, American musician